Bourg-de-Thizy is a former commune of the Rhône department in Rhône-Alpes region in eastern France.

On 1 January 2013, Bourg-de-Thizy and four other communes merged becoming one commune called Thizy-les-Bourgs.

Twin towns
Bourg-de-Thizy is twinned with the small East Yorkshire town of Hessle in the United Kingdom.

References

Former communes of Rhône (department)
Beaujolais (province)